Adhemar (or Ademar) was the son of Prince Peter of Salerno. He succeeded his father, an usurper, in 853.

Adhemar's rule was unpopular. The counts of Capua whittled away at his princely authority and territory. In 858, he had to call in the assistance of Guy I of Spoleto, who demanded the Liri Valley in return.

In 861, a popular revolt, led by Guaifer of the Dauferidi, overthrew him and imprisoned him. He was tortured and subsequently blinded. Guaifer was elected to replace him.

Sources

861 deaths
Princes of Salerno
9th-century rulers in Europe
9th-century Lombard people
Year of birth unknown